Maie Saqui (1880 – March 27, 1907) was an Australian actress, dancer, and Gaiety Girl in London.

Early life 
May Vivian Saqui was born in the Fitzroy neighborhood of Melbourne, the daughter of John Isaac "Jack" Saqui and Ester Barnett "Stella" Saqui. Both of her parents were born in London. Her younger sisters Hazel and Gladys were also actresses. They studied dance in Melbourne with their aunt, Julia Saqui Green.  "I started dancing when I was quite a child, and — well, I didn't stop, and I don't want to stop until I am old," Maie Saqui told a magazine in 1903.

Saqui's father was a gambler who eventually lost the family's fortune and was institutionalized at Yarra Bend Asylum.

Career 
The Saqui sisters, Gladys, Maie, and Hazel, began their careers on the stage in Australia, then moved to England. Maie became a "Gaiety Girl", one of the musical performers connected to the Gaiety Theatre in London. She was in the original cast of The Toreador (1901). She also appeared on the London stage in The Circus Girl (1897), The Geisha (1897-1898), Harlequinade (1900), The Messenger Boy (1900-1901), Gilbert and Sullivan's Trial by Jury (1902) and The Linkman, or, Gaiety Memories (1903).

Personal life 
Maie Saqui married stockbroker Arthur Hope Travers in 1903, and retired from the stage. She died in 1907, aged 27 years, in London.

References 

1880 births
1907 deaths
People from Melbourne
20th-century Australian actresses
Australian emigrants to the United Kingdom